Cranae or Kranai (also Marathonisi) is an island off the coast of Gytheio (ancient Gythium) connected to the land by a causeway built in 1898.

Etymology
Some believe that the etymology for the name Cranae (Kranai) comes from the legendary king of Athens Kranaos, the successor of King Kekropas (Cecrops) as Athens was also known as "Kranaa". However the word Kranaos according to Homer it has the following meanings: 'Rocky', 'ragged', 'hard'. Therefore, some believe that the word Kranai literally means 'rocky', 'rock'.

The name "Marathonisi" translates to 'fennel-island', as the herb fennel was naturally growing on this island.

History
According to legend, when Paris of Troy abducted Helen from Sparta they spent their first night in Cranae. When Gythium became the major port of ancient Sparta, Cranae became a resting spot for traders. After the rest of Greece enslaved to the Ottoman Turks only Mani remained free. The beys of Mani fortified Cranae with a Maniot tower called Tzannetakis Tower built in 1829. Tzannetakis tower today became the Historical and Cultural museum of Mani.

On the island there is a chapel dedicated to St Peter (Agios Petros) which is favored by many couples to use on their weddings due to its beautiful views of the city of Gytheio and picturesque location. There is also a prominent 23m-high lighthouse built in 1873 with high-quality marble from the area of Tainaro in south Mani peninsula.

Gallery

References

Sources
 Pausanias, translated by W.H.S Jones, (1918). Pausanias Description of Greece. London: Harvard University Press. .
 Homer, translated by Alexander Pope. The Iliad. Penguin Books Ltd; New edition (7 Mar 1996). .

Landforms of Laconia
Geography of ancient Laconia
Laconian mythology
Islands of Peloponnese (region)
Locations in the Iliad
East Mani